The Antares MA-32 is the first model in a large family of Ukrainian ultralight trikes that is designed and produced by Antares Aircraft and at one time marketed by Leading Edge Air Foils as the LEAF Antares. The aircraft are supplied as kits for amateur construction.

Design and development
The MA-32 is a two-seat design that was originally developed for European microlight competition flying. It features a cable-braced hang glider-style high-wing, weight-shift controls, an open cockpit, tricycle landing gear and a single engine in pusher configuration.

The aircraft is made from bolted-together aluminum tubing, with titanium used on the carriage structure and wing attachment. The wing is covered in Dacron sailcloth. Its  span wing is supported by a single tube-type kingpost and uses an "A" frame control bar. A number of single or double surface purpose-designed trike wings are optional, including the Aeros Still-17, Aeros Stream-16, Aeros Stranger 2, Aeros Profi, Aerossa Sprinter-15, Aerossa Stratos and the Aerossa Stratos-13. The landing gear uses a unique curved, slab-sided, main gear leg design made from fiberglass that reduces aerodynamic drag. All wheels have suspension and the steerable nose wheel also features a drum brake. A fiberglass cockpit fairing is optional.

The aircraft can all be quickly folded for storage or ground transportation.

Variants
A-10 R503 Solo
The model has the same undercarriage and other features of the MA-32. Wings that can be fitted include the Aero Stranger 2, Aeros Stranger 2M, Aeros Still 17, Aeros Stream 16 or the Aeros Profi.
MA-32
Base two-seat model with Rotax 447 two-stroke powerplant of 
MA-32 R503
Two-seat model with Rotax 503 of 
MA-32 R582 G
MA-33 and MA-33M R582
Two-seat model with Rotax 582 two-stroke powerplant of 
MA-33M R912
MA-34 R912 Ranger
MA-34R912S Beaver
Two-seat model with Rotax 912ULS four-stroke powerplant of 
MA-34 Open Country
MA-34 R582XB Crop Duster	
LEAF Antares 503
Base model marketed by Leading Edge Air Foils, with the Aeros Stream-16 wing, circa 2000. Two-seat model with Rotax 503 of 
LEAF Antares 582
Model marketed by Leading Edge Air Foils, with the Aeros Stranger-15 wing, circa 2000. Two-seat model with Rotax 582 of

Specifications (MA-32)

References

External links

MA-32
1990s Ukrainian ultralight aircraft
Homebuilt aircraft
Single-engined pusher aircraft
Ultralight trikes
Leading Edge Air Foils aircraft